Skiba is a surname. Notable people with the surname include:

 Gerhard Skiba (1947–2019), Austrian politician
 Henri Skiba (1927–2018), French football player
Jakub Skiba (born 1961), Polish civil servant, diplomat
 Jeff Skiba (born 1984), American Paralympian athlete
 Krzysztof Skiba (born 1964), Polish musician, songwriter, satirist, essayist and actor
 Matt Skiba (born 1976), American musician

''' Other:

 Szymon, Katarzina & Feliks Skiba, fictional characters in the 2013 Polish film Ida